The Tamale Vendor is a 1931 American Pre-Code comedy film directed by Fatty Arbuckle and starring Tom Patricola and Charles Judels.

See also
 Fatty Arbuckle filmography

External links

1931 films
1931 comedy films
1931 short films
Films directed by Roscoe Arbuckle
Educational Pictures short films
American black-and-white films
American comedy short films
Films with screenplays by Jack Townley
1930s English-language films
1930s American films